Meningie is a town on the south-east side of Lake Albert in South Australia. It is on the Princes Highway near The Coorong and was surveyed in 1866.

History
The word Meningie is derived from "the Aboriginal word 'meningeng' meaning 'place of mud'".

The town was surveyed between March and June 1866 by W. Farquhar without any proclamation.  Land was offered for sale on 23 August 1866. The name also was used for an "adjoining private subdivision of sections 104, 106/9 and 111" in the cadastral unit of the Hundred of Bonney.

A school was opened in 1869.  A jetty was erected in 1867, with paddle steamers operating between Meningie and other ports on Lake Albert and Lake Alexandrina until 1927/1928. The town ceased to operate as a port in December 1936.

Boundaries for the locality were created for the "long established name" on 24 August 2000 and which include the Government Town of Meningie.

Meningie was the first place in Australia to have ADSL broadband installed without using a Telstra DSLAM. Agile Communications installed their own DSLAM in Meningie in October 2003, following on from having established a microwave network connecting to Adelaide in May 2001. Agile's associated internet service provider, Internode Systems offered services through this DSLAM.

Climate
Meningie experiences a warm-summer mediterranean climate, bordering on a cold semi-arid climate (Köppen climate classification: Csb/BSk), Trewartha: Csbl/BSbl); with warm, dry summers; mild, relatively dry springs and autumns; and mild winters with moderate precipitation.

Tourism

Meningie has attractions and amenities for travellers and is the closest township to the Coorong National Park. The Lake provides visitors with many scenic locations and places to fish, swim, kayak, jet ski and water ski / wake-board.  Bird watchers also enjoy coming to see the range of rare and vulnerable wildlife that the Lake and wetlands support. There are local 4WD tracks, bush walking trails, and indigenous cultural journeys at Camp Coorong. The Meningie Cheese Factory Museum Inc. is wholly owned and operated by volunteers, and is both educational and a tourist attraction for the town. It is alongside the Cheese Factory Restaurant and the Lake Albert Caravan Park which is directly opposite.

In May 2013, a statue of an ostrich wearing a saddle was unveiled to commemorate the story of a local Irish bushranger, John Francis Peggotty, also known as "Birdman of the Coorong".

Media
Meningie is home to The Lakelander, a regional community newspaper whose geographical coverage includes Tailem Bend, Salt Creek, Narrung, Coonalpyn and Tintinara. The newspaper, first issued on 25 June 1976, is published in a magazine format.

Sports

Meningie has a strong sporting culture, and has a well maintained oval, a fully watered, par 72, 18-hole golf course, bike tracks/ motocross jumps, sailing club, and also an airstrip for gliders, light aircraft and balloons.

Meningie has a local Australian rules football club, founded around 1890, known as the Meningie Bears. On 12 December 2007, Meningie player Brodie Martin was rookie listed to Australian Football League (AFL) club Adelaide, becoming the first player from Meningie to be play for an AFL club.  the league coach is Alex Scott.

Other sporting clubs in Meningie include the Meningie Motorcycle Club, Lake Albert Golf Club, Meningie Sailing Club, Meningie Bowling Club, Meningie Pony Club, Meningie Netball Club, Meningie Aero Club and Lake Albert Gun Club. There is also a Meningie Garden Club, Meningie & Districts Lions Club, and several church groups that meet regularly.

Governance
Meningie is located within the federal division of Barker, the state electoral district of MacKillop, and the local government area of the Coorong District Council.

References

External links
Meningie Cheese Factory Museum Inc
Meningie History

Towns in South Australia